The Fulhorn is a mountain of the Plessur Alps, overlooking Churwalden in the canton of Graubünden. It lies on the range separating the Domleschg from Lenzerheide.

References

External links
 Fulhorn on Hikr

Mountains of the Alps
Mountains of Switzerland
Mountains of Graubünden
Two-thousanders of Switzerland
Vaz/Obervaz
Churwalden